Athletics was a sport at the inaugural Central American Games in 1926 (later renamed the Central American and Caribbean Games) and it has remained part of the event's sporting programme throughout its history.

Editions

See also
List of Central American and Caribbean Games records in athletics
List of Central American and Caribbean Games medalists in athletics

References

External links
Official website

 
CAC Games
Athletics